Philip Jacob (16 October 1804 – 20 December 1884) was Archdeacon of Winchester from 1860.

Jacob was the son of John Jacob of Roath Court, Glamorgan. He was educated at Corpus Christi College, Oxford, matriculating in 1821 and graduating B.A. in 1825, M.A. in 1828. He was made deacon in 1827 and ordained priest in 1828, both times by the Bishop of Llandaff. In 1831 he became Rector of Crawley, Hampshire; and in 1834 a Canon of Winchester.

Notes

1804 births
Alumni of Corpus Christi College, Oxford
Archdeacons of Winchester (ancient)
1884 deaths
19th-century English Anglican priests